Education is the means through which the aims and habits of a group of people are sustained from one generation to the next.

Education may also refer to:

 Education (Chittenden Memorial Window), a stained-glass window
 Education (journal), an academic journal
 Education (constituency), functional constituency of Hong Kong
 Educational management, the system of managing educational institutions
 Education, short-form for the cabinet portfolio of a Minister of Education
 Education, short-form for a polity's Ministry of Education
 An Education, a 2009 British film starring Carey Mulligan and Peter Sarsgaard
 Education, a 2020 drama film directed by Steve McQueen.
 School of education, a division within a university
 Western education (disambiguation)

See also
 Educated, a 2018 memoir by Tara Westover
 Educating..., a British television documentary series